Bodrež is a small settlement on the left bank of the Soča River in the Municipality of Kanal ob Soči in the Littoral region of Slovenia.

References

External links
Bodrež on Geopedia

Populated places in the Municipality of Kanal